Tbilisi State Medical University (TSMU) is a leading medical university in Tbilisi, Georgia. More than 85 years have passed since Tbilisi State Medical Institute was founded on the basis of the faculty of Medicine at Tbilisi State University (TSU). In 1992 Tbilisi State Medical Institute was renamed in Medical University.

Rankings and reputation
TSMU is the eight ranked (out of 55) higher-education institution in Georgia. There are almost 7500 undergraduate and 3000 postgraduate students at the University about 25% of whom come from foreign countries. Tbilisi State Medical University has undergone Institutional Evaluation Programme, performed by Association of European.

Executive Board
Rector      - Prof. Zurab Vadachkoria
Chancellor  - Prof. Zurab Orjonikidze
Vice-rector - Prof. Rima Beriashvili
Vice-rector - Prof. Khatuna Todadze
Vice-rector - Prof. Irakli Kokhreidze
Head of Quality Assurance - Prof. Irine Kvatchadze

Recognition 
TSMU is recognized by some of the most prominent bodies across the world:

 NMC (National Medical Commission)
 WHO (World Health Organization)
 Ministry of Education, Georgia
 WFME (World Federation for Medical Education)
 ECFMG (Educational Commission for Foreign Medical Graduates)
 FAIMER (The Foundation for Advancement of International Medical Education and Research)

Duration of MBBS in Tbilisi State Medical University 
MBBS course at Tbilisi State Medical University runs for a total of 6 years including 1 year of internship. The first 2 years are dedicated to basic theoretical or academic medical education, 1 year to pre-clinical, and the last three years deal with clinical courses.

Statistics
 The largest medical university in Georgia and Eastern Europe.
 Founded in 1918.
 Produced more than 40,000 Doctors.
 Founder of Eastern European Medical Association
 Recognized/Listed by World Health Organization, Educational Commission for Foreign Medical Graduates, European Commission for Education, and World Federation of Medical Education. 
 Member of International Association of Universities, European Universities Association. 
 Signatory of Bologna Declaration - European Union Medical Syllabus
 Graduate, Post Graduate and Research Degrees are available in Surgical, Medical, Dental, Nursing and Pharmacy Fields.

Notable people

Alumni
Tsitsino Shurgaya (1981), Georgian surgeon
Sai Pallavi Indian actress

References

Библиография: Тбилисский университет, 1918—1968 гг., Тбилиси, 1968
Шенге-лия М. С. История медицины Грузии, М., 1967

External links
 

 
Universities in Georgia (country)
Universities and institutes established in the Soviet Union
Educational institutions established in 1918
1918 establishments in Georgia (country)
Public medical universities